Aeropesca Colombia Flight 217 was an internal scheduled passenger flight in Colombia from La Vanguardia Airport, Villavicencio to El Dorado International Airport, Bogotá. On 26 March 1982 the flight was operated by a four-engined Vickers Viscount turboprop registered HK-2382 which collided with a mountain at 7,700 feet 130 km south east from Bogotá near Quetame in bad weather. The storm hampered rescue attempts. All 21 on board were killed.

Aircraft
The aircraft was a Vickers Viscount 745D four-engined turboprop that had been built in the United Kingdom in 1956 for Capital Airlines of the United States. First flown on 15 December 1956 it was bought by Aeropesca Colombia in March 1976.

References
Citations

Bibliography

Accidents and incidents involving the Vickers Viscount
Aviation accidents and incidents in Colombia
Aviation accidents and incidents in 1982
March 1982 events in South America
1982 in Colombia
Cundinamarca Department